USS Aster was a steam operated tugboat acquired by the Union Navy during the American Civil War. She was used by the Navy to patrol navigable waterways of the Confederacy to prevent the South from trading with other countries.

Service history 
On 25 July 1864 at Philadelphia, Pennsylvania, the Union Navy purchased the wooden steamer Alice from Bishop, Son, and Company. Renamed Aster, this screw tug was placed in commission on 12 August 1864, Acting Master Samuel Hall in command.
 
On 25 August 1864, Secretary of the Navy Gideon Welles ordered Aster to proceed to waters off Wilmington, North Carolina, for duty in the North Atlantic Blockading Squadron. Since the ship's logs do not seem to have survived, the details of her voyage south are unknown. She apparently joined the squadron in the first fortnight of September, but, on the 16th of that month, was at Norfolk, Virginia, undergoing repairs.
 
She arrived off New Inlet on 7 October and began her blockading duties. About an hour before midnight, she sighted a vessel steaming toward New Inlet and gave chase. Just as she was about to cut off the blockade runner – which later proved to be the Halifax steamer Annie – Aster grounded on Carolina Shoals. Hall and his crew made every effort to refloat Aster, but failed.  came to her aid, but was unable to pull her free. Hall then transferred his crew to Berberry and then, aided by his officers, put the torch to the ship which then blew up.

References 

Ships of the Union Navy
Steamships of the United States Navy
Gunboats of the United States Navy
American Civil War patrol vessels of the United States
Shipwrecks of the American Civil War
Shipwrecks of the Carolina coast
Maritime incidents in October 1864
Ship fires